Making Music So You Don't Have To is the second studio album of Fred.

Hot Press described the album as "a ticklish, impulsive body of work, but its happy, functional marriage of strings, piano and guitars hints that the band have played nice, taken their hyperactivity medication and developed the album into a gratifyingly mature, ambitious and reflective work".

Track listing

References 

2005 albums
Fred (band) albums